Una tribù che balla is the fourth studio album by Italian singer-songwriter Jovanotti, released by FRI Records on 19 April 1991.

The album reached number eleven on the FIMI Singles Chart.

Track listing

Musicians
Jovanotti – voce
Michele Centonze – keyboards, guitar, programming
Luca Cersosimo – keyboards, programming, electronic drums
Saturnino – bass
Giorgio Prezioso – scratch
Demo Morselli – trumpet
Giancarlo Porro – sax
Emanuela Cortesi – backing vocals
Lalla Francia – backing vocals
Paola Folli – backing vocals

Charts and certifications

Charts

Certifications

References

1991 albums
Jovanotti albums
Italian-language albums